Huang Enru (born May 5, 1997 in  Wenzhou, Zhejiang, China) is a Chinese singer and actress, and member of Chinese idol group SNH48's Team SII and a former member of BEJ48's Team J.

Career

BEJ48 and SNH48
On July 16, 2016, Huang became a 1st-generation member of BEJ48, and on April 20, she became a member of BEJ48's Team J. On Oct 29, she made her first public performance  during Team J's first stage, "Exclusive Party".

On July 29, 2017, during SNH48's fourth General Election, Huang came in 10th within BEJ48, becoming part of BEJ48's Top 16.

On July 28, 2018, during SNH48's fifth General Election, Huang came in 38th in SNH48 Group and in 7th within BEJ48.

On July 27, 2019, during SNH48's sixth General Election,  Huang came in 41st in SNH48 Group and in 8th within BEJ48.

On September 9, 2020, she was transferred to SNH48 Team SII.

Produce Camp 2020
In 2020, Huang joined Chinese competition variety show series Chuang 2020 (also known as Produce Camp 2020) as a contestant. Her rankings in order of episode were: 36th, 32nd, 46th, 32nd, 42nd, until she was eliminated on episode 7 in 42nd place overall.

Discography

With SNH48

Albums

EPs

With BEJ48

EPs

Filmography

Films

TV series

Stage Units

BEJ48

SNH48

References

External links
 Official Member Profile 
 
 Huang Enru on Douban

BEJ48 members
Communication University of China alumni
1997 births
Living people
Actresses from Zhejiang
Singers from Zhejiang
People from Wenzhou
Actresses from Wenzhou
Musicians from Wenzhou